Articles in social and political philosophy include:

A 
 A Conflict of Visions
 A Few Words on Non-Intervention
 A Vindication of the Rights of Men
 Accountability
 Action theory
 Actual Idealism
 Adam Müller
 Adamites
 Agency (philosophy)
 Aggravation of class struggle under socialism
 Agonism
 Al-Khidr
 Alan Carter (philosopher)
 Alan Ryan
 Alastair Norcross
 Alexis de Tocqueville
 Alfred Rosenberg
 Alon Ben-Meir
 Altruism
 Anarch (sovereign individual)
 Anarchism in Cuba
 Anarchism in Korea
 Anarchism in Vietnam
 Anarchism
 Anarchist communism
 Anarchist Manifesto
 Anarchist schools of thought
 Anarcho-capitalism
 Anarcho-primitivism
 Anarchy, State, and Utopia
 Andrei Marga
 Animalism (Animal Farm)
 Anomie
 Anti-clericalism
 Anti-communism
 Anti-consumerism
 Anti-elitism
 Anti-environmentalism
 Anti-Germans (communist current)
 Anti-racist mathematics
 Anti-Revisionism
 Anti-Stalinist left
 Antigone (Sophocles)
 Antimilitarism
 António Castanheira Neves
 Antonio Negri
 Apology (Plato)
 Archon
 Aristotle
 Armchair revolutionary
 Armin Mohler
 Arthur Linton Corbin
 Arthur Moeller van den Bruck
 Asian values
 Auctoritas
 Augustinian values
 Austrofascism
 Authenticity (philosophy)
 Authoritarianism
 Authority
 Avant-Garde and Kitsch
 Avant-garde
 Avodah
 Axel Honneth
 Ayn Rand

B 
 Bad faith (existentialism)
 Bad originalism
 Banality of Evil
 Barracks communism
 Basic norm
 Basileus
 Beerwolf
 Benjamin Tucker
 Bertrand Russell
 Between Facts and Norms
 Biopolitics
 Biopower
 Black Panther Party
 Blanquism
 Body politic
 Bolshevik
 Bonapartism (Marxism)
 Bourgeoisie
 Bruno Leoni

C 
 Capital punishment
 Capitalism
 Carl Joachim Friedrich
 Carl Schmitt
 Carlo Lottieri
 Carmen Laforet
 Catonism
 Celine's laws
 Censorship under fascist regimes
 Charles de Secondat, baron de Montesquieu
 Charles Fremont Dight
 Charles Taylor (philosopher)
 Christian communism
 Christian existentialism
 Christofascism
 Citationality
 Citizen Cyborg
 Civic nationalism
 Civic virtue
 Civics
 Civil liberties
 Class collaboration
 Class consciousness
 Classical liberalism
 Claude Lefort
 Claude Lévi-Strauss
 Clerical fascism
 Clericalism
 Cocolo
 Coercion
 Commodity fetishism
 Commodity form theory
 Common ownership
 Heimin Shimbun
 Communicative rationality
 Communism
 Communitarianism
 Communization
 Compassionate conservatism
 Computer ethics
 Conflict theories
 Confucian view of marriage
 Confucianism in Indonesia
 Confucianism
 Confucius
 Conscience
 Consensual living
 Consensus democracy
 Consent of the governed
 Consent theory
 Consequentialist justifications of the state
 Conservatism worldwide
 Conservatism
 Conservative Christianity
 Constantin Rădulescu-Motru
 Constitutional law
 Constitutional right
 Constitutional theory
 Consumerism
 Contemporary Political Theory
 Cooperative federalism
 Core democratic values
 Corelative
 Cornel West
 Cornelius Castoriadis
 Corporatism
 Cosmopolitanism
 Costas Douzinas
 Council communism
 Coup d'État: A Practical Handbook
 Critical discourse analysis
 Critical historiography
 Critical international relations theory
 Critical legal studies
 Critical pedagogy
 Critical race theory
 Criticisms of communism
 Criticism of communist party rule
 Critique: Journal of Socialist Theory
 Critique of capitalism
 Critique of Dialectical Reason
 Crito
 Crypto-fascism
 Ctheory
 Cultural hegemony
 Cultural materialism (anthropology)
 Cultural materialism (cultural studies)
 Cultural studies

D 
 Das Kapital
 David Kolb
 David Miller (political theorist)
 De re publica
 Decembrio - family of scholars
 Defensive democracy
 Definitions of fascism
 Delegate model of representation
 Delegated authority
 Democracy in Marxism
 Democracy
 Democratic centralism
 Democratic consolidation
 Democratic deficit
 Democratic dictatorship
 Democratic Ideals
 Democratic socialism
 Democratic structuring
 Democratic transhumanism
 Dérive
 Dialectic
 Dialectical materialism
 Dialectician
 Dignitas (Roman concept)
 Dimitris Dimitrakos
 Direct democracy
 Director primacy
 Disciples of Confucius
 Discontinuity (Postmodernism)
 Discourse ethics
 Discourse
 Distribution of wealth
 Divine Right of Kings
 Double consciousness
 Doxa
 Dual power
 Duality of structure
 Due process
 Duncan Kennedy
 Dystopia

E 
 Earth jurisprudence
 Eco-socialism
 Ecofascism
 Ecological modernization
 Economic freedom
 Écriture féminine
 Egalitarianism as a Revolt Against Nature and Other Essays
 Election promise
 Election
 Elective rights
 Enlightened self-interest
 Epic and Novel
 Eranos
 Ergatocracy
 Ernest Wamba dia Wamba
 Ernst Bloch
 Essays on Some Unsettled Questions of Political Economy
 Essays, Moral, Political, and Literary
 Essentially contested concept
 Ethic of reciprocity
 Ethical arguments regarding torture
 Ethics in Government Act
 Ethics
 Étienne de La Boétie
 Eugenics
 Eurocommunism
 Evil
 Exceptionalism
 Execution by burning
 Exile and the Kingdom
 Existential humanism
 Existentialism
 Externalization

F 
 Family as a model for the state
 Fascism and ideology
 Fascism
 Fascist manifesto
 Fascist symbolism
 Fatalism
 Federalism
 Federalist
 Feliks Koneczny
 Félix Guattari
 Felix Kaufmann
 Feminist legal theory
 Filial piety
 Fiscal conservatism
 For a New Liberty: The Libertarian Manifesto
 Fourier complex
 Frame of Government of Pennsylvania
 Francesco D'Andrea
 Francis Fukuyama
 Francis Parker Yockey
 Frank Meyer
 Frankfurt School
 Freedom (political)
 Freedom and the Law
 Freedom of contract
 Freudo-Marxism
 Friedrich Hayek
 Führerprinzip
 Functionalism (sociology)
 Fundamental right
 Fusionism (politics)

G 
 Gaullism
 Gemeinschaft and Gesellschaft
 Gender studies
General Will
 Generosity
 Georg Jellinek
 Georg Wilhelm Friedrich Hegel
 George Kateb
 George Ohsawa
 Georges Bataille
 Gerald Cohen
 Giacomo Marramao
 Giambattista Vico
 Gianfranco Sanguinetti
 Gilles Deleuze
 Giorgio Agamben
 Giorgio Del Vecchio
 Global citizens movement
 Global Feminism
 Global Justice Movement
 Global Justice or Global Revenge
 Global justice
 Governance
 Governmentality
 Grassroots democracy
 Green conservatism
 Green liberalism
 Green libertarianism
 Green syndicalism
 Guevarism
 Guy Debord
 Gynocentrism

H 
 H. B. Acton
 H. L. A. Hart
 Habeas corpus
 Habitus (sociology)
 Hannah Arendt
 Hans Achterhuis
 Hans Kelsen
 Hans Köchler
 Hate speech
 Hegemony
 Henri Lefebvre
 Henry David Thoreau
 Henry George
 Henry Pachter
 Henry Sidgwick
 Herman Oliphant
 Hermeneutics
 Historical materialism
 Historical subject
 Historicism
 History of communism
 History of Consciousness
 History of Political Philosophy
 Holism
 Homo sacer
 Houston Stewart Chamberlain
 Hugo Grotius
 Human dignity
 Humanistic psychology

I 
 Identity formation
 Ideology
 Imagined communities
 Immanuel Kant
 Immediatism
 Imperialism
 Imperium
 Inclusive Democracy
 Indeterminacy debate in legal theory
 Indian political philosophy
 Individualism
 Institutional cruelty
 Interculturalism
 Internalization
 International law
 Interpellation
 Interregnum
 Invisible dictatorship
 Invisible hand
 Irenism
 Iris Marion Young
 Irrational Man: A Study in Existential Philosophy
 Irrealism (the arts)
 Isabel Paterson
 Isaiah Berlin
 Islamic democracy
 Islamofascism
 Isonomia
 Italian fascism
 Ivan Chtcheglov

J 
 J. J. C. Smart
 Jacksonian democracy
 James Brusseau
 James Tully (philosopher)
 Janet Biehl
 Janet Coleman
 Jean-François Lyotard
 Jean-Jacques Rousseau
 Jean Bodin
 Jeffersonian democracy
 Jeffersonian political philosophy
 Jeremy Bentham
 Jewish Bolshevism
 John Austin (legal philosopher)
 John Burnheim
 John Finnis
 John Locke
 John Oswald (activist)
 John Rawls
 John Stuart Mill
 John William Miller
 Jonathan Wolff (philosopher)
 Joseph de Torre
 Joseph H. H. Weiler
 Joseph Priestley and Dissent
 Joseph Priestley
 Joseph Raz
 Joshua Cohen (philosopher)
 Juche
 Judicial activism
 Julian Gumperz
 Julien Offray de La Mettrie
 Julius Binder
 Jürgen Habermas
 Jurisdictional arbitrage
 Jurisprudence
 Justice
 Justification for the state
 Justitium

K 
 Karl-Otto Apel
 Karl Marx
 Karl Popper
 Kyklos

L 
 L'existentialisme est un humanisme
 Labor theory of property
 Latin Conservatism
 Law in action
 Law, Legislation and Liberty
 Laws (dialogue)
 Leadership
 League of peace
 Left-libertarianism
 Left communism
 Legal formalism
 Legal origins theory
 Legal positivism
 Legal realism
 Legal science
 Legalism (Chinese philosophy)
 Legalism (Western philosophy)
 Leninism
 Leonard Borgzinner
 Leonard Read
 Leonidas Donskis
 Les jeux sont faits
 Les Temps modernes
 Leviathan (book)
 Lex, Rex
 Li (Confucian)
 Li (Neo-Confucianism)
 Liberal conservatism
 Liberal democracy
 Liberalism in the United States
 Liberalism
 Libertarian Marxism
 Libertarian municipalism
 Libertarian socialism
 Libertarian theories of law
 Libertarian transhumanism
 Libertarianism
 Liberty
 List of basic anarchism topics
 List of basic critical theory topics
 List of Confucianists
 List of critical theorists
 List of critical theory topics
 List of postmodern critics
 List of thinkers and authors associated with Existentialism
 List of works in critical theory
 Literary criticism
 Literary theory
 Living Marxism
 Localism (politics)
 Logos: A Journal of Modern Society and Culture
 Lon L. Fuller
 Loren Lomasky
 Louis Althusser
 Ludwig von Mises
 Luxemburgism
 Lysander Spooner

M 
 Man's Fate
 Mandate of Heaven
 Mandeville's paradox
 Margaret Canovan
 Marginalization
 Market populism
 Martin Luther King Jr.
 Marx's theory of alienation
 Marx's theory of human nature
 Marxism-Leninism
 Marxism
 Marxist philosophy of nature
 Marxist philosophy
 Marxist revisionism
 Master-slave dialectic
 Maurice Cranston
 Max Horkheimer
 Mazdak
 Media accountability
 Media transparency
 Mencius
 Meritarian
 Messianic democracy
 Meta-rights
 Methodological individualism
 Michael Davis (philosopher)
 Michael Novak
 Michael Otsuka
 Michel Foucault
 Mihailo Markovic
 Milan Kangrga
 Minima Moralia
 Minority (philosophy)
 Modalities (sociology)
 Modern liberalism in the United States
 Monarchomachs
 Monopoly on the legitimate use of physical force
 Moral absolutism
 Moral choice
 Moral relativism
 Moral responsibility
 Moral syncretism
 Mortimer Adler
 Mottainai
 Murray Bookchin
 Murray Rothbard
 Musical historicism
 Mutual liberty

N 
 National Catholicism
 Nationalism
 Natural law
 Natural order
 Naturalization
 Negarchy
 Negative and positive rights
 Negative liberty
 Neo-Confucianism
 Neo-Luddism
 Neo-Stalinism
 Neo-theocracy
 Neo-Tribalism
 Neofunctionalism (sociology)
 Netocracy
 New Democracy
 Niccolò Machiavelli
 Nigel Warburton
 Nineteen Eighty-Four
 Norbert Leser
 Norm (philosophy)
 Norm (sociology)
 Normlessness

O 
 Objectivity (philosophy)
 Oligarchy
 Oliver Wendell Holmes Jr.
 Open government
 Open society
 Oppression
 Organic law
 Organic statute
 Organic work
 Organicism
 Original intent
 Original meaning
 Originalism
 Oskar Negt
 Other
 Owenism

P 
 Paleoconservatism
 Paralanguage
 Parity of esteem
 Participatory democracy
 Pasajes de la guerra revolucionaria
 Paul R. Patton
 Paul Virilio
 Peace
 Pentacosiomedimni
 Per Bauhn
 Perpetual peace
 Persecution
 Personal life
 Peter Lamborn Wilson
 Peter Steinberger
 Pew Research Center political typology
 Philanthropreneur
 Philanthropy
 Philip Mazzei
 Philip Pettit
 Philosophical anarchism
 Philosophy of economics
 Philosophy of history
 Philosophy of social science
 Philosophy of Søren Kierkegaard
 Pierre-André Taguieff
 Pierre Bourdieu
 Pirate utopia
 Planned economy
 Plato
 Political argument
 Political consciousness
 Political consumerism
 Political culture
 Political engineering
 Political jurisprudence
 Political Order in Changing Societies
 Political philosophy of Immanuel Kant
 Political philosophy
 Political positivism
 Political radicalism
 Political rehabilitation
 Political sociology
 Political structure
 Political theology
 Politics (Aristotle)
 Politics Drawn from the Very Words of Holy Scripture
 Politics
 Popular front
 Populism
 Positive law
 Positive liberty
 Positivism
 Post-industrial society
 Post-Marxism
 Postcolonialism
 Posthegemony
 Posthumanism
 Postmodern Christianity
 Postmodern social construction of nature
 Potter Box
 Power: A New Social Analysis
 Praxis intervention
 Praxis School
 Prediction theory of law
 Primitive communism
 Principle of law
 Procedural democracy
 Procreative beneficence
 Progressivism in the United States
 Proletarian internationalism
 Proletariat
 Propaganda of the deed
 Property redistribution
 Public reason
 Public sphere
 Public trust
 Punishment
 Punk ideologies
 Purposive theory
 Pyongyang Declaration

Q 
 Queer theory

R 
 Racialism
 Rada Ivekovic
 Radical democracy
 Radical Democracy Party (Chile)
 Rainer Forst
 Ralstonism
 Rate of exploitation
 Rational choice theory
 Raya Dunayevskaya
 Reactionary
 Real freedom
 Real socialism
 Reason and Revolution
 Rechtsstaat
 Red-baiting
 Reification (Marxism)
 Relations of production
 Religious communism
 Religious democracy
 René Viénet
 Representative democracy
 Representative direct democracy
 Republican democracy
 Republican In Name Only
 Ressentiment
 Revolutionary integrationism
 Revolutionary spontaneity
 Richard Gregg
 Richard M. Weaver
 Right-libertarianism
 Right Hegelians
 Right of asylum
 Right of revolution
 Rights
 Rights of Man
 Robert Nozick
 Robert P. George
 Roberto Mangabeira Unger
 Ronald Dworkin
 Rule by decree
 Rule of law
 Russell Kirk

S 
 Scientific Communism
 Scientism
 Secondary antisemitism
 Sectarian democracy
 Secularism
 Secularization
 Self-determination
 Self (philosophy)
 Selfishness
 Semantics
 Seniority
 Serge Moscovici
 Shortage economy
 Significant other
 Simone Weil
 Situationist International
 Small-c conservative
 Social alienation
 Social Choice and Individual Values
 Social conservatism
 Social constructionism
 Social contract
 Social Darwinism
 Social democracy
 Social determinism
 Social engineering (political science)
 Social exclusion
 Social fascism
 Social influence
 Social Justice in the Liberal State
 Social justice
 Social liberalism
 Social medicine
 Social philosophy
 Social progress
 Social psychology (sociology)
 Social reality
 Social responsibility
 Social Solidarity
 Socialism
 Socialist realism
 Societal attitudes toward homosexuality
 Societal attitudes towards abortion
 Society
 Soft paternalism
 Soft tyranny
 Solange Pierre
 Søren Kierkegaard and Friedrich Nietzsche
 South Park and Philosophy: You Know, I Learned Something Today
 Sovereignty
 Soviet democracy
 Spectacle (Situationism)
 Stalinism
 State and Revolution
 State capitalism
 State of emergency
 State of nature
 State racism
 Stateless communism
 States and Social Revolutions
 Statesman (dialogue)
 Statolatry
 Stealth conservative
 Stephen Bronner
 Stereotype
 Stirrings Still: The International Journal of Existential Literature
 Strict constructionism
 Structuration
 Subjective expected utility
 Substantive democracy
 Sultanism
 Suppression of dissent
 Synoecism
 Systematic ideology

T 
 T. M. Scanlon
 Tabula rasa
 Tacitean studies
 Taistoism
 Taking Rights Seriously
 Takis Fotopoulos
 Tara Smith (philosopher)
 Teaching for social justice
 Techniques of neutralization
 Ten Days that Shook the World
 Textualism
 The Adulterous Woman
 The aestheticization of politics
 The Black Book of Communism
 The Case of the Speluncean Explorers
 The Commonwealth of Oceana
 The Communist Manifesto
 The Concept of Law
 The Doctrine of Fascism
 The Establishment
 The Ethics of Liberty
 The Existential Negation Campaign
 The Faces of Janus
 The French Revolution (Carlyle)
 The Inclusion of the Other
 The Kingdom of this World
 The Machiavellian Moment
 The Market for Liberty
 The Metamorphosis
 The Middle Way
 The Myth of the Rational Voter
 The Phenomenology of Spirit
 The Plague
 The Possessed (play)
 The Prince
 The Rebel
 The Renegade (Camus short story)
 The Republic (Plato)
 The Rhetoric of Hitler's "Battle"
 The Roman Revolution
 The Second Sex
 The Silent Men
 The Soul of Man under Socialism
 The Stranger (Camus novel)
 The Third Wave
 The Vision of the Anointed
 The Work of Art in the Age of Mechanical Reproduction
 Theatre of the Absurd
 Theodor Sternberg
 Theodor W. Adorno
 Theory of criminal justice
 Theory of Subversion and Containment
 Third Way (centrism)
 Thomas Hill Green
 Thomas Hobbes
 Þorsteinn Gylfason
 Thought of Thomas Aquinas
 Three Principles of the People
 Three sided football
 Titoism
 Todd May
 Toleration
 Tony Honoré
 Torture
 Totalitarian democracy
 Totalitarianism
 Tradition
 Traditional Chinese social structure
 Traditionalist Conservatism
 Transformative justice
 Translating "law" to other European languages
 Truth
 Two Concepts of Liberty
 Two Treatises of Government
 Tyranny of the majority

U 
 Unity of opposites
 Universal ethic
 Universal pragmatics
 Unorganisation
 Utopia

V 
 Value (personal and cultural)
 Value judgment
 Value pluralism
 Varieties of democracy
 Victor d'Hupay
 Virtue jurisprudence
 Vox populi

W 
 Wagnerism
 Waiting for Godot
 Waking Life
 Walter Benjamin
 War
 Washing out mouth with soap
 Wesley Newcomb Hohfeld
 Wild law
 Wildness
 Wilhelm Dilthey
 Will (philosophy)
 William Fontaine
 William James
 William Paley
 William Sweet
 Workers of the world, unite!
 Wu Enyu

Y 
 Young Hegelians

Z 
 Zeitgeist

See also
 Index of sociopolitical thinkers

 
 
Social and political